Since 1901, the Nobel Prizes and the Nobel Memorial Prize in Economic Sciences, which began in 1969, have been awarded 609 times to 975 people and 27 organizations. The Nobel Prizes are awarded, according to Alfred Nobel's will, to "those who, during the preceding year, have conferred the greatest benefit to mankind."

There is only one Filipino Nobel laureate – Rappler journalist Maria Ressa who received the Nobel Peace Prize in 2021.

There are noted Filipinos and Philippine-based organizations who are affiliated with awarded organizations such the Philippine Red Cross being part of the League of Red Cross Societies (awarded the Peace Prize in 1963) since September 1947 and the Jesuit priest and environmentalist Jose Ramon Villarin who is a member of the International Panel on Climate Change (IPCC) in 2007 when it was awarded.

Laureates

Members of laureate organizations
The following Philippine-based organizations and Filipino individuals were significant members who contributed largely in making a larger organization become a Nobel laureate.

Nominations

Nominees
Since 1929, Filipinos have started to receive nominations for the prestigious Swedish prize. The following list are the nominees with verified nominations from the Nobel Committee and recognized international organizations. There are also other purported nominees whose nominations are yet to be verified since the archives are revealed 50 years after, among them:
 For Physics: Casimiro del Rosario (1896–1982), Edgardo Escultura (born 1936), Henry J. Ramos (born 1950) and Reinabelle Reyes (born 1984)
 For Chemistry: Baldomero Olivera (born 1941), Lourdes J. Cruz (born 1942) and Lawrence Que Jr. (born 1949).
 For Physiology or Medicine: Roseli Ocampo-Friedmann (1937–2005), Fe del Mundo (1911–2011), Katherine Luzuriaga (born 1956), Nicanor Austriaco (born 1968) and Aldo Carrascoso (born 1978).
 For Literature: Lázaro Francisco (1898–1980), Wilfrido Ma. Guerrero (1910–1995), Edilberto K. Tiempo (1913–1996), N. V. M. Gonzalez (1915–1999), Nick Joaquin (1917–2004), Francisco Sionil Jose (1924–2022), Lualhati Bautista (1945–2023), Virgilio S. Almario (born 1944), Cristina Pantoja-Hidalgo (born 1944), Jessica Hagedorn (born 1949), Jose Dalisay Jr. (born 1954), Luisa Igloria (born 1961) and Gina Apostol (born 1963).
 For Peace: Larry Itliong (1913–1977), Jose W. Diokno (1922–1987), Narciso G. Reyes (1914–1996), Cardinal Jaime Sin (1928–2005), Miriam Defensor Santiago (1945–2016), Benigno Aquino III (1960–2021), Sis. Mary John Mananzan (born 1937), Rodrigo Duterte (born 1945), Antonio Meloto (born 1950), Joan Carling (born 1963), Rodne Galicha (born 1979), Rural Missionaries of the Philippines (founded in 1969), Free Legal Assistance Group (founded in 1974), Task Force Detainees of the Philippines (founded in 1974), Karapatan Alliance Philippines (founded in 1995) and Philippine Ecumenical Peace Platform (founded in 2007).
 For Economics: Bruce Tolentino (born 1953) and Bp. Gilbert Garcera (born 1959).

Nominators
The following Philippine-based organizations and Filipino individuals became nominators of various candidates, local and international, for the Nobel Prize.

See also
 List of Asian Nobel laureates

Notes

References

Lists of Nobel laureates by nationality
Lists of Filipino people